The following lists events that happened during 1881 in China.

Incumbents
 Guangxu Emperor (7th year)
 Regent: Empress Dowager Cixi

Events

February
 February 24 - Zeng Jize and the Russian representative concluded the Treaty of Saint Petersburg.

July
 July 20 - earthquake of magnitude 6.5 occurred in Gansu and Lanzhou.

Deaths 
 April 8 - Empress Dowager Ci'an. (aged 43; Born on 12 August 1837)

References